The Chinese Democracy Tour was a worldwide concert tour by American rock band Guns N' Roses to promote the group's album Chinese Democracy. It began in 2001, with three U.S. dates and a Brazilian one, while their 2002 tour included Asian, North American and a few European dates. The band did not tour again until May 2006, when it toured North America again and performed a major tour of Europe. The band's tour continued in 2007 with shows in Australia, New Zealand, Japan and Mexico.

Their first show after the 2008 release of Chinese Democracy was in Taiwan on December 11, 2009. In the same month, the group played South Korea for the first time, as well as two dates in Japan. Since 2010 the tour has continued with concerts in North America, South/Central America, Europe and Australia. As of late 2010, the entire tour had attracted a total audience of about 4,000,000 people. The ten-year tour came to a close on the final day of 2011, with a New Year's Eve show in Las Vegas, making it their second longest tour ever, just behind Use Your Illusion Tour, as well as their most-played concert tour ever, with 239 total shows.

Band members' history
The bulk of the band remained stable throughout the tour: lead vocalist Axl Rose; keyboardist and backing vocalist Dizzy Reed; bassist and backing vocalist Tommy Stinson; co-lead guitarist Robin Finck; and keyboardist, programmer and backing vocalist Chris Pitman. The main lineup changes were in the form of rhythm guitarists (Paul Tobias from 2001 to 2002, Richard Fortus from 2002 to present), lead guitarists partnering Finck (Buckethead from 2001 to 2004, Ron "Bumblefoot" Thal from 2006 to 2014) and drummers (Brain from 2001 to 2006, Frank Ferrer from 2006 to present). The 2006/2007 tour lineup—Rose, Reed, Stinson, Pitman, Finck, Fortus, Thal and Ferrer—remained to complete the album, released in 2008. Finck rejoined Nine Inch Nails in 2008, and was replaced by Sixx:A.M. guitarist DJ Ashba in 2009.

2001 European Tour
The 2001 European Tour (often referred to as the Chinese Democracy Tour) was a scheduled concert tour by Guns N' Roses, planned in support of the band's then-upcoming sixth studio album Chinese Democracy. Initially due to begin and end in June, many tour dates were rescheduled for December due to the reported illness of guitarist Buckethead. The re-configured tour was later cancelled outright.

Background
Following the Use Your Illusion Tour, which ran for over two years and visited 27 countries, and the release of cover album "The Spaghetti Incident?" in November 1993, the band began to write new material. Relationships between band members began deteriorating, however, and the future of Guns N' Roses was in doubt. As members turned focus to their own side-projects tensions began to grow.

Gilby Clarke was the first to leave the band, reportedly being fired in June 1994. On October 30, 1996, it was announced that lead guitarist Slash had officially left the band, after having not been involved since 1995 due to a poor relationship with vocalist Axl Rose. Drummer Matt Sorum was fired from the band after an argument with guitarist Paul Tobias, and Duff McKagan became the last member to leave in 1997. With only one remaining original member, Axl Rose, and one other member from the "Use Your Illusion" lineup, Dizzy Reed, Guns N' Roses began the search for new musicians, while the former members continued with their respective solo and band careers, with Slash, McKagan and Sorum later forming Velvet Revolver with Stone Temple Pilots vocalist Scott Weiland in 2003.

Robin Finck became the band's lead guitarist in 1997, followed shortly the next year by drummer Josh Freese and bassist Tommy Stinson. Finck left the band in 1999 to rejoin his former band Nine Inch Nails, before the band recorded and released their first new song in six years in the form of "Oh My God". A number of changes to the band occurred in 2000, including the departure of Freese, the hiring of lead guitarist Buckethead and drummer Brain, and the return of Robin Finck. Along with these changes came the news that Guns N' Roses were planning a tour in the summer of 2001, and would be playing at the Rock in Rio festival in January.

Warm-up shows
The first warm-up show for the upcoming tour of Europe was announced in December 2000 as a New Year's Day performance at the House of Blues in Las Vegas. It was also rumoured that the long-awaited Chinese Democracy would be released in June 2001, for which the scheduled European Tour would be promotional. Guns N' Roses – then composed of vocalist Axl Rose, lead guitarists Buckethead and Robin Finck, rhythm guitarist Paul Tobias (who joined in 1994 to replace Gilby Clarke), bassist Tommy Stinson, drummer Brain and keyboardists Dizzy Reed (still with the band since joining in 1990) and Chris Pitman (who joined between 1998 and 2000) – completed the band's first performance in seven years, which was praised as "a triumphant return" by music magazine Rolling Stone. The band performed a number of new songs, including "Oh My God" (released as a single in 1999), "Riad N' The Bedouins", "Chinese Democracy", "Street of Dreams" (all later released on Chinese Democracy) and "Silkworms" (which was reworked and released as a single in August 2021), including a bulk of original songs and 'classics' such as "Welcome to the Jungle", "Paradise City", "November Rain" and "You Could Be Mine". The Las Vegas show was followed two weeks later by the performance at Rock in Rio in Rio de Janeiro, Brazil. The performance featured a similar set list, which also included the live debut of new song "Madagascar". MTV praised the performance as "The capstone of the third night of the [...] festival", summarising it as "an exciting show."

Cancellations
Guns N' Roses were due to begin their European Tour on June 1 at the German music festival Rock am Ring, but announced in May that they were to cancel the entire tour; according to the band's European management agency, the reason for the cancellation was the illness of lead guitarist Buckethead. With a rescheduling process said to be planned, it was later announced that many of the proposed tour dates would be completed later in the year. On November 8, it was announced that the tour was to be cancelled completely, allegedly due to the ongoing illness of Buckethead, which was also said to have delayed the completion of the upcoming album. The band's manager, Doug Goldstein, apologised to fans for scheduling the tour, which he admitted was a poorly executed decision, with the following statement:

Despite not being able to complete their tour of Europe, the full lineup of Guns N' Roses performed two more shows in 2001, both at The Joint, Hard Rock Hotel and Casino in Las Vegas, on December 29 and 31. Songs performed made up similar set lists to those at the January performances.

Set list

January 1, 2001 – House of Blues, Las Vegas, Nevada
Main set:
"Welcome to the Jungle"
"It's So Easy"
"Mr. Brownstone"
"Live and Let Die"
"Oh My God"
"My Michelle"
"Think About You"
"You Could Be Mine"
"Sweet Child o' Mine"
"Knockin' on Heaven's Door"
"November Rain"
"Out ta Get Me"
"Riad N' The Bedouins"
"Chinese Democracy"
"Rocket Queen"
"Patience"
"Street of Dreams (The Blues)"
"Nightrain"
Encores:
"Silkworms"
"Paradise City"

January 14, 2001 – Rock in Rio, Rio de Janeiro, Brazil
Main set:
"Welcome to the Jungle"
"It's So Easy"
"Mr. Brownstone"
"Live and Let Die"
"Oh My God"
"Think About You"
"You Could Be Mine"
"Sweet Child o' Mine"
"Knockin' on Heaven's Door"
"Madagascar"
"November Rain"
"Out ta Get Me"
"Rocket Queen"
"Chinese Democracy"
"Street of Dreams (The Blues)"
"Patience"
"Nightrain"
Encores:
"My Michelle"
"Silkworms"
"Paradise City"

Personnel
Axl Rose – lead vocals, piano, rhythm guitar, whistle, whistling
Robin Finck – lead guitar, rhythm guitar, backing vocals
Buckethead – lead guitar, rhythm guitar, acoustic guitar
Paul Tobias – rhythm guitar, slide guitar, backing vocals
Tommy Stinson – bass, backing vocals
Brain – drums, percussion
Dizzy Reed – keyboards, backing vocals
Chris Pitman – keyboards, samples, backing vocals

Tour dates

2002/2003 World Tour
Chinese Democracy Tour 2002 was the band's first major tour since 1993. The North American leg was organized in the autumn of 2002 to support the supposed release of Chinese Democracy, and was announced on September 25, 2002, as the Chinese Democracy Tour. Thirty-five dates had originally been scheduled, but the band ended up performing at only sixteen.

Set list
Madagascar, Chinese Democracy and Street of Dreams were played frequently while Riad N' The Bedouins was dropped a few dates later. Welcome to the Jungle opened the show and Paradise City ended the encore on all dates.

August 18, 2002 – WTC Open Air Stadium, Osaka, Japan
Main set:
"Welcome to the Jungle"
"It's So Easy"
"Mr. Brownstone"
"Live and Let Die"
"Think About You"
"You Could Be Mine"
"Sweet Child o' Mine"
"Knockin' on Heaven's Door"
"Out ta Get Me"
"Riad N' The Bedouins"
"Madagascar"
"November Rain"
"Rocket Queen"
"Nightrain"
"Street of Dreams (The Blues)"
"Chinese Democracy"
"Patience"
Encore:
"Paradise City"

December 5, 2002 – Madison Square Garden, New York City
Main set:
"Welcome to the Jungle"
"It's So Easy"
"Mr. Brownstone"
"Live and Let Die"
"Knockin' on Heaven's Door"
"Think About You"
"You Could Be Mine"
"Sweet Child o' Mine"
"Out ta Get Me"
"November Rain"
"Chinese Democracy"
"Madagascar"
"Rocket Queen"
"Street of Dreams (The Blues)"
"My Michelle"
"Patience"
"Nightrain"
Encore:
"Paradise City"

Personnel
The only line-up change for this tour was the addition of rhythm guitarist Richard Fortus, replacing Paul Tobias due to the fact the latter no longer wished to tour. However, Tobias never officially left the band and continues to work with them. The touring line up for the 2002 tours of Europe, Asia and North America consisted of:

Axl Rose – lead vocals, piano, whistle, whistling
Robin Finck – lead guitar, rhythm guitar, backing vocals
Buckethead – lead guitar, acoustic guitar
Richard Fortus – rhythm guitar, slide guitar, backing vocals
Tommy Stinson – bass, backing vocals
Brain – drums
Dizzy Reed – keyboards, piano, percussion, backing vocals
Chris Pitman – keyboards, programming, backing vocals

Tour dates

2004 At Rock in Rio Lisbon
After the 2002 tour was cancelled the band went into hiatus until they were scheduled to play at Rock in Rio Lisboa 1 in May 2004. However lead guitarist Buckethead left the band in March 2004 and their appearance was cancelled and Axl Rose made the following statement:

2006/2007 World Tour

The Chinese Democracy Tour 2006 was a concert tour by Guns N' Roses promoting their upcoming album Chinese Democracy. It started in May 2006 when the band launched a European tour, headlining both the Download Festival and Rock in Rio Lisboa. Four warm-up shows preceded the tour at Hammerstein Ballroom in New York City, and became the band's first live concert dates since the short 2002 tour. The shows also marked the debut of virtuoso fusion guitarist and composer Ron Thal (a.k.a. Bumblefoot) on lead guitar, replacing Buckethead. During the course of this tour, Izzy Stradlin and Sebastian Bach made frequent guest appearances. The European dates played to over 700,000 people during 32 shows in 18 countries.

Set list
The band brought You're Crazy, Used to Love Her and Down On The Farm for some dates. Better, I.R.S. and There Was a Time made their live-debut reinforcing rumors about a Chinese Democracy release in 2006. 

July 29, 2006 – Wembley Arena, London, England
Main set:
"Welcome to the Jungle"
"It's So Easy"
"Mr. Brownstone"
"Live and Let Die"
"Sweet Child o' Mine"
"Knockin' on Heaven's Door"
"Street of Dreams (The Blues)"
"Better"
"You Could Be Mine"
"Out ta Get Me"
"Sway"
"Sailing"
"Back in the U.S.S.R."
"Think About You"
"My Michelle"
"Patience"
"November Rain"
"Rocket Queen"
"Nightrain"
Encores:
"I.R.S."
"Paradise City"

September 23, 2006 – KROQ Inland Invasion, Hyundai Pavilion, San Bernardino, California
Main set:
"Welcome to the Jungle"
"It's So Easy"
"Mr. Brownstone"
"Live and Let Die"
"Sweet Child o' Mine"
"Knockin' on Heaven's Door"
"You Could Be Mine"
"Street of Dreams (The Blues)"
"Out ta Get Me"
"November Rain"
"Better"
"My Michelle"
"I.R.S."
"Patience"
"Nightrain"
Encores:
"Rocket Queen"
"Madagascar"
"Paradise City"

Personnel
The only line-up change for this tour was that of guitarist Ron "Bumblefoot" Thal replacing the departed Buckethead. Also, drummer Brain missed the second half of the European tour because of the birth of his daughter in early July. He was temporarily replaced by session drummer Frank Ferrer. The line up of the European and North American Tours was:

Axl Rose – lead vocals, piano, whistle, whistling, tambourine, keyboards
Robin Finck – lead guitar, rhythm guitar, backing vocals
Ron "Bumblefoot" Thal – lead guitar, rhythm guitar
Richard Fortus – rhythm guitar, lead guitar, slide guitar, backing vocals
Tommy Stinson – bass, backing vocals
Frank Ferrer – drums
Dizzy Reed – keyboards, piano, percussion, backing vocals
Chris Pitman – keyboards, programming, backing vocals
Brain– drums (until replaced by Frank Ferrer)

Tour dates

North American leg
On August 31, 2006, Axl Rose appeared on MTV Video Music Awards as a presenter, noting that the band would go on a North American tour on October 24. Five warm-up shows for the tour were held in September 2006, with two at the Hard Rock Hotel and Casino in Las Vegas two at Warfield Theatre in San Francisco and one show in Devore for KROQ's Inland Invasion 2006.

Following the band's appearance at Inland Invasion on September 23, a handful of subsequent warm-up shows were postponed, which led to rumours that this was carried out in order to finalize the work on the new album. The rumors were seemingly denied by manager Merck Mercuriadis, who stated that the shows had been merely moved to "fit in with the main body of the tour". He did, however, once again state that Chinese Democracy would be out before the end of the year. The actual tour, again called the Chinese Democracy Tour, was now scheduled to begin on October 20 in Jacksonville, Florida.

The Jacksonville show was moved to October 31, with the show of October 22 in Nashville, Tennessee, postponed up to January 2007, until being cancelled in December. The tour commenced on October 24 in Sunrise, Florida, now ringing true to Rose's prior statement.

During the 2006 North American tour the band's opening acts included SuicideGirls, Papa Roach, Sebastian Bach, Die Mannequin and Helmet. The band were also joined onstage by former Gunner Izzy Stradlin and Metallica drummer Lars Ulrich both making one-off appearances. Bubbles, Ricky, and Julian of the Trailer Park Boys made some appearances in Canada. Long-time drummer Brain took a leave from his touring responsibilities before the October tour dates to spend more time with his family. He was replaced by his understudy Frank Ferrer. Brain did not return to the band and Ferrer became the band's full-time drummer.

Eagles of Death Metal were supposed to go on tour with Guns N' Roses. On November 24, 2006, in Cleveland, Ohio, during their first concert with Guns N' Roses, the band was not well received by the crowd. When Axl Rose came out to perform, he asked the crowd whether they enjoyed "the Pigeons of Shit Metal", following with an onstage announcement the band wouldn't open for the Guns during the remainder of the tour. Soon after, Eagles of Death Metal released a statement regarding the incident:

"At first the audience refused to welcome us to the jungle, but by the time we took our final bow, it had become paradise city. Although Axl tried to November rain on our parade, no sweet child o' mine can derail the EODM night train. We say live and let die."

Tour dates

2007 World Tour 
Chinese Democracy Tour 2007 was a continuation of the previous tour promoting Chinese Democracy. The album had a tentative release date in March according to Axl Rose, but it did not materialize. The band continued touring in Mexico, Australia, New Zealand and Japan. Mucc was the opening act for the Japanese leg of the tour. They also performed two songs at Rodeo Drive's Walk of Style.

Walk of Style Ceremony
This performance featured keyboardist Chris Pitman on bass guitar, as Tommy Stinson was unable to attend due to a personal family issue. They played acoustic versions of "Knockin' On Heaven's Door" and "Sweet Child O' Mine" to close out the ceremony.

Tour dates

2009–2011 World Tour
Rumors started in February that Guns N' Roses would perform Spain and Italy in June, and continued through the year with comments from Irving Azoff about a Summer Stadium Tour but nothing happened.

On November 10, 2009, after speculation about shows in Japan, the band announced on their MySpace four dates in Asia and thirteen in Canada. More dates were added later for South America and Europe.

On August 15, 2010, a cancellation notice for the remaining shows of the tour was posted on Rose's Twitter. The statement would later be refuted on the official Guns N' Roses Twitter and Facebook, with claims that the tweets were being looked into. Several hours later, the band confirmed that Axl's account had been hacked, and the band would in fact continue the tour.

Following the events that took place at the Reading Festival where the organizers pulled the plug on their set because they passed the curfew time, Axl Rose said his Twitter account criticizing the organizers for failing to factor in the set change times.

Towards the end of the European leg, Duff McKagan joined Guns N' Roses onstage for the first time in seventeen years on October 14, playing bass on "You Could Be Mine" and guitar on "Knockin' On Heaven's Door", "Nice Boys" and "Patience" at London's O2 Arena.

On November 5, 2010, DJ Ashba confirmed the tour would continue across the U.S. in 2011. On October 2, 2011, the band came back to South America playing Rock In Rio in front of 100,000 people. After passing through Argentina, Chile and Paraguay, the first US tour in five years took place with positive reviews.

Set list
All of the songs from Chinese Democracy with the exception of "Riad N' The Bedouins" were played at the show in Tokyo, along with 9 songs from Appetite for Destruction. A cover of AC/DC's "Whole Lotta Rosie" has also been frequently played. In 2011, the band added "Estranged" to the set. The Tokyo setlist below is the longest set Guns N' Roses has ever played. The setlist on the right is a typical setlist from the 2011 tour.

December 19, 2009 – Tokyo Dome, Tokyo, Japan
Main set:
"Chinese Democracy"
"Welcome to the Jungle"
"It's So Easy"
"Mr. Brownstone"
"Catcher in the Rye"
"Sorry"
"If the World"
"Live and Let Die"
"Street of Dreams"
"You Could Be Mine"
"Rocket Queen"
"My Michelle"
"Sweet Child o' Mine"
"Shackler's Revenge"
"I.R.S."
"November Rain"
"Whole Lotta Rosie"
"Knockin' on Heaven's Door"
"Scraped"
"Prostitute"
"This I Love"
"Out ta Get Me"
"Don't Cry" (Original)
"Nightrain"
Encore:
"Madagascar"
"There Was a Time"
"My Generation"
"Better"
"Patience"
"Nice Boys"
"Paradise City"

November 19, 2011 – The Comcast Theatre, Hartford, Connecticut 
Main set:
"Chinese Democracy"
"Welcome to the Jungle"
"It's So Easy"
"Mr. Brownstone"
"Sorry"
"Riff Raff"
"Estranged"
"Better"
"Rocket Queen"
"Live and Let Die"
"This I Love"
"Shackler's Revenge"
"My Generation"
"Street of Dreams"
"You Could Be Mine"
"Sweet Child o' Mine"
"November Rain"
"Don't Cry" (Original)
"Whole Lotta Rosie"
"Out ta Get Me"
"Knockin' on Heaven's Door"
"Nightrain"
Encore:
"Madagascar"
"Nice Boys"
"Patience"
"Paradise City"

Personnel
The only line-up change for this tour was that of guitarist DJ Ashba replacing the departed Robin Finck.
Axl Rose – lead vocals, piano, whistle, whistling
Dizzy Reed – keyboards, piano, percussion, backing vocals
Tommy Stinson – bass, backing vocals, lead vocals
DJ Ashba – lead guitar, rhythm guitar, snare drum
Ron "Bumblefoot" Thal – lead guitar, rhythm guitar, acoustic guitar, backing vocals
Richard Fortus – rhythm guitar, lead guitar, acoustic guitar, slide guitar, backing vocals
Chris Pitman – keyboards, samples, tambourine, backing vocals
Frank Ferrer – drums, tambourine

Tour dates

Supporting acts
2001 (Rock in Rio): Pato Fú, Carlinhos Brown, IRA! e Ultraje a Rigor, Papa Roach and Oasis
2002 (Europe): Weezer, Slipknot (Leeds Festival only)
2002 (North America): CKY and Mix Master Mike
2006 (Europe): Living Things, Sex Action, Funeral For A Friend, To My Surprise, Stone Sour, The Darkness, Xutos e Pontapés, Pitty, Oddzial Zamkniety, Shakra, Amulet, 4Lyn, Sebastian Bach, Papa Roach, Bullet for My Valentine, Melrose, Shakerleg, Avenged Sevenfold and Towers of London
2006 (North America): Phantom Planet, Hoobastank, Sebastian Bach, Papa Roach, The Suicide Girls, Die Mannequin, Novadriver, Modern Day Zero and Helmet
2007 (Mexico): The Volture and Maligno
2007 (Oceania): Sebastian Bach and Rose Tattoo
2007 (Japan): Mucc
2009 (Taiwan): Matzka
2009 (Korea): GUMX
2009 (Japan): Mucc
2010 (Canada): Sebastian Bach and Danko Jones
2010 (Latin America): Sebastian Bach, Puya, Vivora, Angelus, Armand DJ, Océano, Los 33, Black Drawing Chalks, Rockvox, Viuda Negra, León Bruno, Electrocirkus, Pixel, Gaia, Space Bee, Massacre, La Mancha de Rolando, Killterry, Vendetta, ReyToro, Rosa Tattooada, Rock Rocket, Forgotten Boys, Khalice
2010 (Europe): Danko Jones, Murderdolls, Sebastian Bach, Imperial State Electric and Night Shift
2010 (Australia): Korn, Spiderbait, Shihad and The Delta Riggs
2010 (United Arab Emirates): Juliana Down
2011 (Rock in Rio): System of a Down, Evanescence, Detonautas and Pitty
2011 (Latin America): Dion, Utopians, La Mancha de Rolando, El bordo, Poc, The Volture and Agora
2011 (North America): Buckcherry, The Sword, Reverend Horton Heat, Hinder, Adelitas Way, Asking Alexandria, Sebastian Bach, Black Label Society, The Pretty Reckless, Loaded, Steel Panther and The Crystal Method

Songs played
Guns N' Roses relied on an Appetite for Destruction heavy set list whilst adding new songs from the upcoming album Chinese Democracy, such as "Street of Dreams (The Blues)", "Madagascar" and the title track. In 2006, with regard to the leaks, Rose commented, "This is for all you downloading fuckers" and added "Better" and "I.R.S." (more often than not played) and "There Was a Time" (less often) to the set list.

Songs played between January 1, 2001, and December 31, 2011.

References

Guns N' Roses concert tours
Guns N' Roses
2001 concert tours
2002 concert tours
2004 concert tours
2006 concert tours
2007 concert tours
2009 concert tours
2010 concert tours
2011 concert tours